Babu Banarasi Das University (also known as BBD University) is a private university having its Main Campus in Lucknow, Uttar Pradesh, India established by Akhilesh Das in 2010 and named after his father and former Chief Minister of Uttar Pradesh, Babu Banarasi Das. The university was incepted by an Act (No. 25 of 2010) of State Legislature of Uttar Pradesh as a State Private University and UGC vide its letter no 8-30/2010(CPP-I/PU) dated 17 February 2011 empowered it to award degrees under section 22 of the UGC Act, 1956.

Campus 
The main campus of the university is located in Faizabad road, a busy highway road. The campus has Ganesha temple at the entrance, large academic buildings and library, hostels for boys and girls, and a cricket ground. The Crown Mall, containing shops, restaurant and theatre, is nearby.

References

External links 
 

Universities and colleges in Lucknow
Private universities in Uttar Pradesh
1998 establishments in Uttar Pradesh
Educational institutions established in 1998